Disney's Jungle Cubs is an American animated series produced by Walt Disney Television Animation for ABC in 1996, serving as the prequel to the 1967 film The Jungle Book as it's set in the youth of the animal characters years before the events of the film. The show was a hit, running for two seasons in syndication before its re-runs to the Disney Channel. The show was broadcast on Toon Disney, but was taken off the schedule in 2001. Re-runs aired on Disney Junior in the US from 2012 to 2013. The show also aired in the United Kingdom on Disney Cinemagic and in Latin America.

The show's theme song is a hip hop version of the song, "The Bare Necessities" performed by Lou Rawls. Jungle Cubs was animated by Walt Disney Television Animation (Australia) Pty. Ltd.,  Wang Film Productions Co., Ltd., Thai Wang Film Productions Co., Ltd.,  Toon City Animation, Inc., and Sunmin Image Pictures Co., Ltd., with Studio B Productions, as the animation pre-production studio of the series.

Characters

 Baloo (voiced by Pamela Adlon) is a laid-back sloth bear. He likes to play with his friends and sometimes plays pranks on Bagheera in order to snap the latter out of his uptight attitude. He is the unofficial leader of the friends.
 Bagheera (voiced by Elizabeth Daily in Season 1 and then Dee Bradley Baker in Season 2) is a sensible and level-headed panther who rarely gets into trouble. He has an obsession with maintaining good personal hygiene. Bagheera is affectionately known as "Baggy" or "Bags" and is the youngest of the group. Despite having a Home Counties English accent in the original film, Bagheera speaks with an American accent in the series. Bagheera is usually second in command of the group.
 Louie (voiced by Jason Marsden in Season 1 and then Cree Summer in Season 2) is an orangutan. He is very physically active, spending a great deal of his time in trees and eating bananas, and wants to become king of the jungle one day, and when any man made objects turn up he immediately shows great interest.
 Shere Khan (voiced by Jason Marsden) is an arrogant and hot-tempered Bengal tiger. He often tries to intimidate the other animals, but his flair suffers when faced with actual problems. He is often called "Khannie" by Baloo and Louie. Despite having a well-spoken English accent in the original film, Shere Khan speaks with an American accent in the series.
 Kaa (voiced by Jim Cummings) is a young Indian python who wants to hypnotize other animals, but his skills at hypnosis are currently erratic at best.
 Hathi (voiced by Rob Paulsen in Season 1, Stephen Furst in Season 2) is an elephant who attempts to keep the group in order but is known to stammer when stressed. He is also very stubborn. Later, he develops a huge crush on Winifred, who is his wife in The Jungle Book. He is often called "Little Peanut" by Baloo. Despite having a strong southern English accent in the original film, Hathi speaks with an American accent in the series.
 Cecil and Arthur (voiced by Michael McKean and David Lander) are two vultures who are constantly hoping for one of the cubs to die so that they can eat them. However, they are never seen as a threat. 
 Mahra (voiced by Tress MacNeille) is a ruthless baboon that lives in Pinnacle Rock within the wasteland. She and her dim-witted sons have often antagonized the Jungle Cubs when they enter the wasteland. One particular instance is when she and her sons return from a long journey and she wants a new animal skin blanket after her old one is destroyed.
 Ned (voiced by Charlie Adler) is one of Mahra's sons.
 Jed (voiced by Jim Cummings) is one of Mahra's sons.
 Fred (voiced by Jim Cummings) is one of Mahra's sons.

Locations
 The Cub House, a small temple that the gang and friends use as a club house.
 The Wasteland, a huge area surrounding the jungle. Not many animals live out here, except for birds of prey, insects, porcupines and baboons, such as Mahra and her three sons, who live there. It is also where an evil dictator turtle lives.
 Pinnacle Rock, a tall pinnacle-shaped rock in The Wasteland. This large rock is the lair of Mahra and her sons.
 The River, a large river that is where a lot of animals drink at and live at. Arthur & Cecil's nest and cliff are near here.
 The Man Village, a large village inhabited by humans.
 Wangjanga Gorge or The Honey Cliffs, an enormous gorge with a stream running through it. It is also called "The Honey Cliffs" because a lot of bees nest on the gorge's cliffs. It appears to have a bad reputation, since it is mentioned by Louie that no one had been down here and lived to tell the tale, but during the red dog invasion, Baloo and Kaa managed to survive when they were chased by the resident bees.
 The Middle Jungle, a deeply hidden area with only one entrance, the throne in The Cub House. Once the snake-like lever has been pulled, the throne moves to reveal a hidden doorway going underground. Once one has travelled down the underground river, they emerge from a large crack in the ground which is in The Middle Jungle. There are the ruins of an old city up ahead and that is where the treasure is hidden, but it is being guarded by a giant white cobra named Whitehood.
 The Quicksand Bog is mentioned in Fool Me Once....
 Creepy Deepy Swamp, a dark and scary looking swamp near the heart of the jungle. A sarus crane lives here.
 The Mountains, tall, high, snowy mountains that provide the river with water. It is also where a female bighorn sheep lives.
 The Western Jungle, the west side of the jungle. This is where a sloth and his woodpecker friends live.
 Baboon Lagoon, a lagoon where some baboons live. These particular baboons are friends with the water buffalo.
 The Great Lost Temple, an old temple that is used as a music concert.

Episodes

Series overview

Season 1 (1996)

Season 2 (1997–98)

Voice cast

Pamela Segall as Baloo
E.G. Daily as Bagheera (Season 1)
Dee Bradley Baker as Bagheera (Season 2)
Jason Marsden as Shere Khan, Louie (Season 1), Benny
Cree Summer as Louie (Season 2)
Rob Paulsen as Hathi and Akela (Season 1)
Stephen Furst as Hathi (Season 2)
Jim Cummings as Kaa, Fred, Jed, Older Louie Older Hathi Older Kaa and Older Bagheera
David Lander as Arthur
Michael McKean as Cecil

Additional voices

Adam Wylie as Mungo
Andrew J. Ferchland
April Winchell as Mother Bird, Shrew, Old Monkey Lady
Bebe Neuwirth as LaasLa
Brandy Norwood as Latecia
Charlie Adler as Ned
Dorien Wilson as Yarren
Frank Welker as Crane, Crocodile, Frogs, Rhino
Gretchen Palmer as Old Monkey Lady
Jeannie Elias as Clyde
Jeff Bennett as McCoy
Jess Harnell as Toucan
Kath Soucie as Grandma Kahn, Mommie Mouse, Mother Duck, Winifred, Leah
Kenneth Mars as Buffalo
Mari Morrow as Juwanna
Susan Tolsky as Clarisse
Tony Jay as Older Shere Khan
Tress MacNeille as Mahra
Vanessa Williams as Trech
Vivica A. Fox as Lima
Yolanda Snowball as Beckie
Yvette Wilson as Kateri

Crew
Lou Rawls - Singer
Jamie Thomason - Voice Casting Director & Dialogue Director

Home media

VHS releases

US releases
Two VHS releases containing 6 episodes of the series were released in the United States.

UK, Australia and New Zealand releases
Three VHS releases containing 11 episodes of the series were released in  the UK, Australia and New Zealand. These international releases included newly-animated wraparounds set at unspecified points during the original film with Mowgli (voiced by Tyler Mullen) interacting with the characters as adults, as they recall events from their childhood through the series' episodes.  In these segments, Baloo is voiced by Ed Gilbert, Bagheera, Hathi, Kaa and Louie are voiced by Jim Cummings and Shere Khan is voiced by Tony Jay. Gilbert, Cummings and Jay reprised their roles from TaleSpin.

DVD releases
On September 8, 2003, one DVD containing three episodes of the series was released in the United Kingdom.

Australian and New Zealand releases
On September 12, 2003, three DVDs containing eleven episodes of the series was released.

Digital releases
In 2016, the entire series was made available for purchase on digital in the United States through Amazon Instant Video, ITunes, and Google Play. As of 2022, the series has yet to be released on Disney+.

Titles in other languages
 
Brazilian Portuguese: Filhotes da Selva 
Castilian Spanish: Los Cachorros del Libro de la Selva
French: Le Livre de la jungle, souvenirs d'enfance
Latin American Spanish: El Librito de la Selva
Svenska: Lilla Djungelboken
German: Dschungelbuch Kids
Russian: Детёныши джунглей

Notes

References

External links

 Jungle Cubs Official Website
 
 
 Jungle Cubs at Don Markstein's Toonopedia. Archived from the original on October 22, 2016.

1990s American animated television series
1990s American children's comedy television series
1996 American television series debuts
1998 American television series endings
ABC Kids (TV programming block)
American Broadcasting Company original programming
American children's animated adventure television series
American children's animated comedy television series
American children's animated fantasy television series
American prequel television series
Disney Channel original programming
Disney Junior original programming
The Jungle Book (franchise)
Animated television series about bears
Animated television series about cats
Animated television series about elephants
Television series about snakes
Animated television series about apes
Television series about tigers
Animated television series about children
Television series based on Disney films
Television series based on adaptations
Television series by Disney Television Animation
Television shows set in India
Child versions of cartoon characters
English-language television shows